Sixth Ward may refer to:

Places
6th Ward of New Orleans, a ward of New Orleans
Sixth Ward, Houston, a neighborhood of Houston
Ward 6, St. Louis City, an aldermanic ward of St. Louis
Ward 6, one of the neighborhoods of Washington, D.C.
Ward 6, the name of several wards of Zimbabwe
Stittsville Ward, Ottawa (also known as Ward 6)

Other uses

"Ward No. 6", a short story by Anton Chekhov 
Ward Six, a 1978 Yugoslav adaptation of the Chekhov story